The Football League Apprentice of the Year is an annual award in English football, awarded by the League Football Education. To be eligible the players must be under-18 or turn 18 during the current season.

In 2019, The EFL partnered with LFE.

Awards

Championship

League One

League Two

Winners by club

Winners by nationality

References

External links
League Football Education

English football trophies and awards
Annual events in England
Annual sporting events in the United Kingdom